The 2019 Canadian Junior Open Squash Championships is the men's edition of the 2019 Canadian Junior Open Squash Championships, which is a World Junior Squash Circuit Tier 3 event. The event took place at The Club at White Oaks from December 6 to 10. Juan Sebastian Salazar Gomez from Mexico claimed his first Canadian Junior Open title after defeating the Canadian Maaz Mufti 3–0 in the Boys' Under 19 final. Gabriel Yun from Canada won his first Canadian Junior Open title defeating Shomari Wiltshire of Guyana in the Boys' Under 17 final.

Seeds (Boys' Under 19)

Draw and results

Finals

Top half

Section 1

Section 2

Bottom half

Section 1

Section 2

See also
British Junior Open Squash 2018
French Junior Open Squash
2018 US Junior Open Squash Championships
World Junior Squash Championships

References

2018 in squash
Squash in Canada
Squash tournaments in Canada